Child World was an American toy retailer founded in 1962. It grew to 182 sites and revenues of $830 million before failing in 1992. It was known for the distinctive stylised castle store exterior adopted after its 1977 purchase of the Children's Palace store chain.

History

Beginnings and early expansion

Child World was founded by Sid Schneider and Joseph Arnesano in Quincy, Massachusetts in 1962. It became a publicly-traded corporation in 1968, based in Avon, Massachusetts.

After its acquisition of Children's Palace, from Kobacker Stores in 1975, Child World became the second largest toy retailer in the United States after Toys "R" Us. In many areas Child World stores operated near Toys "R" Us locations.

Post merger, Child World began incorporating the Children's Palace stylised castle decor into its new stores. The 1981 purchase of Child World by Cole National Corporation was followed by 1984's Kohlberg Kravis Roberts takeover of Cole.

Until 1990 under President Peter Hayes, Child World employed a warehouse merchandising style with long aisles and over-stock storage above selling shelves.

Sales began to decline by the late 1980s, so in 1989 the chain announced a different  store format. It was initially trialed in Framingham, Massachusetts, near the Shoppers World mall with competitor Toys "R" Us a block away. The new store had a strong first-day and performed well in the firm's critical Christmas selling season. Management announced 11 existing sites would be converted from 1990 through 1992 using the new design. That was not to be.

Downfall

In 1990, Peter Hayes and several fellow executives were terminated. Consumer confidence was generally low and there were no must have toys on the market to drive sales as they had done in the 1980s.

Cole National began restricting the amount of money it provided to the subsidiary causing cash shortages. Vendors including LEGO refused to extend credit which left stores with empty shelves. Meanwhile Toys "R" Us continued to grow and Child World had to defend a lawsuit from the Consumer Products Safety Commission.

Child World ended 1990 with US$830 million in assets but US$1 billion in liabilities. Cole National sought to sell the ailing chain. A US$157 million deal fell through and there were no other buyers. In 1991, it emerged senior executive James Maybury had been diverting revenue to fund a museum he intended to open in Dracut, MA. Cole National had to perform a debt trade with fellow venture capital firm Avon Investment Limited Partnership later that year in order to shed the business. Avon appointed former Toys "R" Us executives but results remained poor and in early 1992 Child World closed 26 stores.

Bankruptcy, failed merger, and liquidation 

In April 1992, Child World applied for Chapter 11 bankruptcy protection causing former Child World managers and Cole National executives to file a class-action lawsuit against Avon, accusing it of sabotaging the company so they could liquidate it and avoid payments to them. A further 54 stores were identified for closure as Child World focussed on 71 previously profitable Northeastern United States stores it sought funds to keep open. Lenders were not forthcoming and the business reported further losses. Avon sought a last ditch merger of Child World with Lionel Corporation's also financially troubled Lionel Kiddie City but were ultimately unable to agree terms. An “inventory clearance" sale became a liquidation; most headquarters staff were sacked, and by mid September 1992 Child World ceased to exist. Lionel Kiddie City went out of business one year later.

Store design 

Child World was known largely for making its stores resemble castles, complete with turrets, battlements, and three arches (two small, one large) in the front door. The corporate logo was written in a "refrigerator magnet"-like typeface. The design started showing up in newer Child World stores after the 1977 acquisition of Children's Palace. After the company went out of business, some of the retailers that took over the Child World spaces retained the design, but most did not.

Mascot 

The mascot for Child World was originally a cartoon rabbit named Happy Rabbit who sported the words "I'm Happy" on his T-shirt. He was later replaced by a cartoon panda bear named Peter Panda, often depicted wearing overalls with his name printed on them.

In popular culture 
A Child World store that stood at 7600 West Roosevelt Road in Forest Park, Illinois (since demolished), was used in Martin Scorsese's 1986 film The Color of Money as the place where Vincent Lauria (Tom Cruise) worked as a toy-store clerk, and where retired pool hustler Eddie 'Fast Eddie' Felson (Paul Newman) came to see him to convince him to be his protégé in pool.

Mark Wahlberg mentions it in Ted 2, as the place where Ted the foul-mouthed bear was purchased.

References

Defunct retail companies of the United States
Companies based in Massachusetts
Companies that filed for Chapter 11 bankruptcy in 1992
Retail companies disestablished in 1993
Retail companies established in 1970
Defunct companies based in Massachusetts
Toy retailers of the United States